Fenedy Masauvakalo (born 4 November 1984),  is a Vanuatuan footballer and a striker that plays for Vanuatu. He is currently the national team's captain.

International career
He scored against Fiji in a 3–2 away win during 2018 Oceanian World Cup Qualification.

International goals
As of match played 4 June 2016. Vanuatu score listed first, score column indicates score after each Masauvakalo goal.

References

1984 births
Living people
Vanuatuan footballers
Vanuatu international footballers
2008 OFC Nations Cup players
2016 OFC Nations Cup players
Association football forwards